Mohamed Akkari (born 1978 in Tunis - death April 28 2017 in Mahdia) was a Tunisian actor and Radio personality.  Mohamed Akkari died of a heart attack following surgery. He is buried in the Mahdia Marine Cemetery in the presence of a good number of actors and fans. Rabaa Essefi said that the last sequence of the Dawama soap opera filmed with Mohamed was carried out in Sfax a week before his death.

Filmography

Films 

 2014 : Habass Kadheb (Liar Prison) de Nabil Barkati (short film)
 2016 : Crash d'Alaaeddine et Bahaeddine Jlassi (short film)
 2017 : Beauty and the Dogs by Kaouther Ben Hania

Televisions 

 2013 : Layem by Khaled Barsaoui : Karim
 2014 : Naouret El Hawa by Madih Belaïd : Fadhel
 2014 : Maktoub (saison 4) by Sami Fehri : Khaled
 2015 : Plus belle la vie (season 11) by Didier Albert 
 2015 : Le Risque by Nasreddine Shili
 2015 : Histoires tunisiennes by Nada Mezni Hafaiedh
 2015-2016 : Nsibti Laaziza by Slaheddine Essid
 2017 : Dawama by Naim Ben Rhouma
 2017 : Awlad Moufida (season 3) by Sami Fehri

Radio 

 2014 : Radio Réveil and Jawwek 9-12 in Radio IFM :  Radio personality
 2015 : Summertime in Radio Kelma :  Radio personality

References

External links 

1978 births
2017 deaths
Tunisian male television actors
Tunisian male film actors
Tunisian male stage actors
People from Tunis